Aricia morronensis, the Spanish argus, is a butterfly of the family Lycaenidae. It is found in Spain and Hautes-Pyrénées (France).

The wingspan is 22–26 mm. Adults are on wing from June to September in usually one, but sometimes two generations per year.

The larvae feed on the leaves of Erodium species. They are attended by ants. The species overwinters in the larval stage.

Description from Seitz

L. idas Rbr. (79 k). Above black-brown with dark median spot on the forewing, the fringes pale, only slightly darkened at the tips of the veins. Underside coffee-brown, with feeble reddish tinge, the ocelli being similarly arranged as in astrarche; the hindwing with pale longitudinal streak from the centre of the wing to the middle of the outer margin, the streak being generally much more prominent than in our figure. — In the Sierra Nevada, at 1000 ft., in July.

Subspecies
Aricia morronensis morronensis present in Andalusia (South Spain) and South Albacete and Murcia.
Aricia morronensis hersselbarthi (Manley, 1970) in Abejar (Soria, Spain)
Aricia morronensis ramburi (Verity, 1913) present in Sierra Nevada
Aricia morronensis boudrani (Leraut, 1999) present at the Col du Tourmalet  and the Cirque de Gavarnie des Hautes-Pyrénées.

References

  (2009): Concerning Aricia morronensis in the south and south-east of Spain: new localities, a revision of its sub-specific status, and a proposal of synonymy (Lepidoptera, Lycaenidae). Atalanta 40 (1/2): 193-199, 331. Full article: .
  (2008): The first known parasitoid of Aricia morronensis (Ribbe, 1910), an endemic Iberian species, and notes on the parasitoids (Hymenoptera; Diptera) of the genus Aricia in Europe (Lep.: Lycaenidae; Hymenoptera: Braconidae, Ichneumonidae; Diptera: Tachinidae). Atalanta 39 (1/4): 343-346, 423. Full article: .

Butterflies described in 1910
Aricia (butterfly)
Butterflies of Europe